Rose Davies (born 21 December 1999) in Newcastle, New South Wales, is an Australian athlete.

Early years 
Davies was 12-years-old when she first started running. At 14, she was the best in the nation, clocking times of 2:08 (800m) and 4:27 (1500m). She tried hard to improve on these times but it took five years to do so. In 2016 she remembers watching the Rio 2016  Olympics never thinking that she could ever qualify for an Olympics.

Davies then got Scott Westcott as her coach. His approach was critical as he allowed her to run as she wished, sometimes missing sessions or only running part of the program. Slowly she became committed and in 2018 she started to emerge off track and was placed third at the national U20 cross country. She then ran 10km of 34:34 at Burnie, Tasmania in October 2018.

Achievements 
In 2018 Davies won the Lisa Ondieki U20 3000m and at the age of 19 clocked 4:19 (1500m) and 15:45 (5000m). She then came second in the national cross country and third at Zatopek with 33:25.52. (Zatopek is named after Emil Zatopek, the Czech long distance runner, it is the most prestigious track race in Australia). Davies ran an outstanding 32:02 road 10km in Launceston, Tasmania in December 2020. 

In 2021 she won Zatopek in clocking 31:39.97. In May, 2021 she achieved her first Olympic qualifier of 15:08.48 over 5000m in Holland. 

She competed in the women's 5000 metres event at the 2020 Summer Olympics. Davies came 18th in her heat with a time of 15:50.07 and was eliminated from the competition.

References

External links
 

1999 births
Living people
Australian female long-distance runners
Athletes (track and field) at the 2020 Summer Olympics
Olympic athletes of Australia
Sportswomen from New South Wales
21st-century Australian women